The eOdisha Summit 2014 was the second edition of the eOdisha Summit, a Conference, Exhibition and Awards Summit held on January 24, 2014 in Bhubaneswar, Odisha, India with themes of Governance, Information Technology (IT) and Healthcare. The eOdisha Summit 2014's Chief Guest was the Chief Minister of Odisha, Naveen Patnaik and the Guest of Honors were Pratap Keshari Deb, Minister of Food Supplies and Consumers Welfare, Employment and Technical Education and Training, Information Technology (IT), Government of Odisha, Madhusudan Padhi, Commissioner-cum-Secretary, Department of Information Technology (IT), Government of Odisha, Dr. Omkar Rai, Director General, Software Technology Parks of India and Dr. S S Mantha Chairman of All India Council for Technical Education.

Objectives
To provide a platform to stakeholders in ICT to address regional issues and the challenges in the development sector
To highlight the regional perspectives and to draw the attention of concerned authorities towards addressing these challenges
To highlight best practices at the community level and deliberate on ways of replicating the same across different regions
To provide a platform to address issues of urban-rural divide in ICT usage and increase the scope of the same
To expand and diversify the multiple stakeholder voices in order to make the community more dynamic and vibrant, thereby, incorporating issues of contemporary relevance
To promote public private partnerships in ICT in development initiatives to address region-specific concerns

eOdisha Awards

Jury
 Vishal Dev, Chairman & MD, Odisha Industrial Infrastructure Development Corporation
 Gopal Krishna Nayak, Director, International Institute of Information Technology, Bhubaneswar
 Manas Panda, Additional Director, Software Technology Parks of India, Bhubaneswar
 Aditya Mohapatra, Head, IT Promotion Cell, Odisha Computer Application Centre

Awards

Speakers

Partners
Powered by: eGov 
Government Partners: Employment and Technical Education & Training Department, Government of Odisha, National Rural Health Mission, National Horticulture Mission 
Public Sector Undertaking (PSU) Partners: Mahanadi Coalfields, MSTC, National Aluminium Company, Odisha Industrial Infrastructure Development Corporation, Paradip Port Trust 
Principal Banking Partner: State Bank of India 
Banking Partners: Canara Bank, ICICI Bank, National Bank for Agriculture and Rural Development, Odisha State Cooperative Bank, UCO Bank 
Health Partners: Biocon, Odisha Trust of Technical Education (OTTET) Telemedicine, Ziqitza Health Care
Knowledge Partner: Odisha Knowledge Corporation Limited
Security Partner: CA, Inc.
Skill Partner: Infrastructure Leasing & Financial Services
Industry Partner: IMFA
Presenting Magazine: eGov 
Radio Partner: BIG FM 92.7 
Electronics Media Partner: EletsTV, ET Now

External links
 Official Website of eOdisha Summit 2014
 How to Prepare Boq for eProcurement?

References

Odisha
2014 conferences
Technology conferences
Business conferences in India
E-government in India